Rumen Hristov (born 22 March 1975) is a retired Bulgarian footballer.

Career

Born in Plovdiv, Hristov started his career with local outfit Maritsa Plovdiv. His most successful period was with CSKA Sofia - he won a Bulgarian Cup with the "redmen" in 1999 and became vice-champion of Bulgaria in 2000. He also earned a championship bronze medal in 1998. A Plovdiv football legend, Hristov's nickname is Romario. He debuted for the national side in 1995.

International goal
Scores and results list Bulgaria's goal tally first.

References

1975 births
Living people
Bulgarian footballers
Association football forwards
Botev Plovdiv players
PFC CSKA Sofia players
FC Lokomotiv 1929 Sofia players
PFC Dobrudzha Dobrich players
First Professional Football League (Bulgaria) players
Bulgaria international footballers